The Chin National League for Democracy (CNLD) is a political party in Myanmar seeking to represent the interests of the Chin people.

History
Following the reintroduction of multi-party democracy after the 8888 Uprising, the CNLD contested 13 seats in the 1990 general elections. It received 0.4% of the vote, winning three seats: U.C.K. Taikwell in Falam 1, Za Hlei Thang in Falam 2 and U Shein Pe Ling in Mindat.

The party was banned by the military government on 18 March 1992, but was a member of the government-in-exile.

The party did not contest the 2010 general elections.

References

External links
 

Political parties in Myanmar
1989 establishments in Myanmar
Political parties established in 1989